The 2013 Guangzhou International Women's Open (named as GRC Bank Guangzhou International Women's Open for sponsorship reasons) was a women's tennis tournament played on outdoor hard courts. It was the 10th edition of the Guangzhou International Women's Open, and part of the WTA International tournaments of the 2013 WTA Tour. It  took place in Guangzhou, China, from September 16 through September 21, 2013.

Singles main-draw entrants

Seeds 

 1 Rankings are as of September 9, 2013

Other entrants
The following players received wildcards into the singles main draw:
  Shahar Pe'er 
  Zhang Shuai 
  Zheng Saisai

The following players received entry from the qualifying draw:
  Richèl Hogenkamp
  Jovana Jakšić 
  Nadiia Kichenok
  Vania King 
  Johanna Konta
  Luksika Kumkhum

Withdrawals
Before the tournament
  Karin Knapp
  Monica Niculescu

Doubles main-draw entrants

Seeds

1 Rankings are as of September 9, 2013

Other entrants
The following pairs received wildcards into the doubles main draw:
  Liu Chang /  Tian Ran
  Tang Hao Chen /  Yang Zhaoxuan

Champions

Singles

 Zhang Shuai def.  Vania King, 7–6(7–1), 6–1 
This was Zhang Shuai's first WTA title.

Doubles

 Hsieh Su-wei /  Peng Shuai def.  Vania King /  Galina Voskoboeva, 6–3, 4–6, [12–10]

References

External links 
Official website

2013
Guangzhou International Women's Open
Guangzhou International Women's Open